Events from the year 1974 in Sweden

Incumbents
 Monarch – Carl XVI Gustaf
 Prime Minister – Olof Palme

Events

Popular culture

Literature
 Eyvind Johnson and Harry Martinson are awarded the Nobel Prize in Literature. The two laureates were members of the Swedish Academy at the time; the decision was criticized by the media, and Martinson committed suicide in 1978.

Births

 26 May – Lars Frölander, swimmer.
 30 July – Josefin Åsberg, film art director.
 24 October – Joakim Nätterqvist, actor
 19 December – Minna Telde, horse rider.
 20 December – Angelica Ljungquist, beach volleyball player

Deaths

 7 May – Gustaf Dyrsch, horse rider (born 1890).
 29 October – Axel Cadier, wrestler, Olympic champion in 1936 (born 1906).

See also
 1974 in Swedish television

References

 
Years of the 20th century in Sweden